Southern Football League Cup or Southern League Cup may refer to:

Southern League Cup (Scotland)
Southern Football League Cup (England)